Lago di Chiusi is a lake in the Province of Siena, Tuscany, Italy. At an elevation of 251 m, its surface area is 3.87 km².

Lakes of Tuscany
Chiusi
Province of Siena